The 1882–83 Scottish Districts season is a record of all the  rugby union matches for Scotland's district teams.

It includes the East of Scotland District versus West of Scotland District trial match.

History

Glasgow District backed up last season's win in the Inter-City with another win against Edinburgh District. The Midlands District were due to play North of Scotland District on 23 December 1882; but the north team did not turn up. The match was advertised and a crowd had formed at the Institution ground at Balgay Farm, Dundee. The Institution team provided a XV; and the rest of the Midlands District players drawn from St. Andrews University, Dundee HSFP and Panmure provided a XV - and so an Institution vs Rest of Midlands match was instead played.

The East v West match was played, despite a covering of the pitch by 2 inches of snow. Both teams were a man short, so the match was played 14 men against 14 men.

Results

Inter-City

Glasgow District: G. Mitchell (West of Scotland), A. J. W. Reid (West of Scotland), and D. W. Kidston (Glasgow Academicals), A. R. Wilson (Glasgow University), J. F. Adamson (West of Scotland), J. B. Brown (Glasgow Academicals), W. A. Walls (Glasgow Academicals), J. G. Mowat (Glasgow Academicals), B. Allan (Glasgow Academicals), D. Y. Cassels (West of Scotland), D. McCowan (West of Scotland), J. Jamieson (West of Scotland), A. Walker (West of Scotland), R. E. Beveridge (Glasgow University), J. S. Lang (Glasgow University).

Edinburgh District: J. P. Veitch (Royal HSFP), M. Reid (Loretto), H. Brooks (Edinburgh University), H. H. Littlejohn (Edinburgh Academicals), G. Aitchison (Edinburgh Wanderers), T. Ainslie (Edinburgh Institution F.P.) [captain], D. Somerville (Edinburgh Institution F.P.), C. Reid (Edinburgh Academicals), A. G. Mossman (Edinburgh Academicals), R. Thorburn (Edinburgh Academicals), William Peterkin (Edinburgh University), A. Keep (Edinburgh University), G.C. Alexander (Edinburgh Wanderers), E. Morrison (Edinburgh Wanderers), J. Greig (Edinburgh Wanderers)

Other Scottish matches

Dundee Institution F.P.: Back, Grant; half-backs, W. Sharp and Dick ; quarterbacks, Alexander and Christian; forwards, G. Luis (captain), J. H. Luis, F. Sharp, W. G. Thomson, J. K. Thomson, Adie, H. Hill, E. Hill, A. Wells, P. Lowe (Perth). 

Rest of Midlands District: Back, Kae; halfbacks, H. Stiven, G. Stiven, Crabbe (Panmure) ; quarter-backs, Stark and Braid ; forwards, C. Morrison (captain), Menzies, McKerrncher, Scott, 1. Bell (St. Andrews), Hutchison, Ferguson (High School F.P.s), Dow, Fraser (Panmure)

North: J. C. Anderson (St. Andrew's University), W. R. Sharp (Dundee Institution) and W. C. Myles (Aberdeen University) (half-backs), C. Braid (St. Andrew's University) and J. Alexander (Dundee Institution) (quarters), C. Morrison (St. Andrew's University), T. Bell (St. Andrew's University), M. McKerracher (St. Andrew's University), P. R. Lowe (Perth), T. G. Luis (St. Andrew's University) [captain], G.C. Adie (St. Andrew's University), J.K.Thompson (St. Andrew's University), P. Menzies (St. Andrew's University), T. Anderson (Perth), and F. Sharp (Dundee Institution)

South: J. Simpson (Melrose) (back), A. Sanderson (Galashiels) and R. H. Bridie (Greenock Wanderers) (half-backs), A. B. Aitken (Greenock Wanderers) and A. Haig (Melrose) (Quarter-backs), J. E. Gilchrist (Greenock Wanderers) [captain], G. Gilchrist (Greenock Wanderers), R. Lucock (Greenock Wanderers), W. Gibb (Greenock Wanderers), J. Ward (Galashiels), W. Kerr (Earlston), J. S. Turnbull (Kelso), A. T. Clay (Kelso), T. Logan (Kelso), and T. Amos (Hawick)

East: J. P. Veitch (Royal HSFP), H. Brooks (Edinburgh University), M. F. Reid (Loretto), W. S. Hopper (Edinburgh Institution) and P. W. Smeaton (Edinburgh Academicals) (quarter-backs), R. Ainslie (Edinburgh Institution) [captain], T. Ainslie (Edinburgh Institution), and D. Somerville (Edinburgh Institution), E. Morrison (Edinburgh Wanderers), W. Peterkin (Edinburgh University), C. Keep (Edinburgh University), J. A. G. Malone (Edinburgh University), G. Adie (Dundee Institution), and J. Tod (Watsonians)

West: D. W. Kidston (Glasgow Academicals) (back), A. J. W. Reid (West of Scotland) and A. P. Reid (West of Scotland) (hair-backs), C. W. Dunlop (West of Scotland) and A. R. Wilson (Glasgow University) (quarter-backs). B. Allan (Glasgow Academicals). J. B. Brown (Glasgow Academicals), G. H. Robb (Glasgow Academicals), Hylands (Glasgow Southern). Morton, D. Y. Cassels (captain), A. Walker, D. McGowan, and J. Jamieson.

English matches

No other District matches played.

International matches

No touring matches this season.

References

1882–83 in Scottish rugby union
Scottish Districts seasons